Quantou Town is a town in the northeast of Liaoning province, China. It is under the administration of Changtu County. It is served by China National Highway 102.

Administrative divisions
There are 12 villages under the town's administration.

Villages:

Quantou Community()
Majia Village
Daweizi Village (大苇子村)
Hulin Village
Shihuzi Village
Quantou Village
Qiaokoudong Village
Lianhe Village
Nonglin Village
Huangdingzi Village
Erdao Village
Linchang

References

Towns in Liaoning
Tieling